Christine Chow Ma (Christine Chow Mei-ching) (born November 30, 1952) is a Hong Kong-born Taiwanese lawyer and former First Lady of the Republic of China from 2008 until 2016. She is married to Ma Ying-jeou, the former president of Taiwan.

Biography
Chow was born in British Hong Kong in 1952, with family roots in Nanjing, Jiangsu province of Mainland China. She graduated from Taipei First Girls' High School and received her bachelor of laws degree from National Chengchi University and a master of laws (LL.M.) degree from New York University Law School.

Chow was a high-school classmate of Ma Ying-jeou's sister. Chow and Ma married in New York. She worked as a research assistant, assistant librarian, and even maître d’hôtel at a Chinese restaurant to support her husband through Harvard Law School. They have two daughters, Lesley (Ma Wei-chung, 馬唯中) and Kelly (Ma Yuan-chung, 馬元中). Lesley was born in 1980 in New York City when Ma was attending Harvard; she completed her undergraduate work at Harvard University and is a graduate student at New York University. The younger daughter, Kelly, was born in Taiwan and is pursuing her undergraduate studies at Brown University in Rhode Island.

Ma was employed at the Mega International Commercial Bank in Taiwan in its legal department. After Ma won the 2008 presidential election, she said she would continue her professional work. At the time, the only change she has made to her lifestyle was taking a chauffeured ride to work instead of public transportation.

In a change of course, Ma, in a 15 July 2008 CNN interview, stated that his wife would resign her post at the bank to avoid any conflicts of interest or arouse suspicions during his presidency.  Her resignation marked a major change for the career-oriented First Lady.

Personality
Chow is presented as a stark contrast from her predecessor, Chen Shui-bian's first lady, Wu Shu-chen; Chow is known for staying out of the political limelight and has rarely joined officials' wives at social or official functions. Chow has stated that she will not fulfill "traditional" first lady responsibilities (no former first ladies held an active occupation); she has, however, said that she will fill in on meeting and greeting dignitaries if she has the time.

See also
 First Lady of the Republic of China

References

1952 births
Living people
First ladies of the Republic of China
20th-century Taiwanese lawyers
New York University School of Law alumni
Taiwanese people from Jiangsu
National Chengchi University alumni
Hong Kong emigrants to Taiwan
Taiwanese women lawyers
21st-century Taiwanese lawyers